Dale Troy Cooper (October 16, 1918 – March 22, 1977), known professionally as Stoney Cooper, was an American country star and member of the Grand Ole Opry. He played the fiddle and the guitar.

Biography
Cooper was the son of Kenny and Stella (Raines) Cooper of Harman, West Virginia, United States.  His family was among the first settlers of Randolph and Pendleton counties, and these roots in the Appalachian mountains had an impact upon his music.

While in high school, Cooper was a member of the Leary Family Singers. In 1939, he married Wilma Lee Leary. They became Wilma Lee and Stoney Cooper, one of the biggest country music acts of the 1940s through the 1960s.  They had one daughter, Carol Lee Cooper.

In 1947, they were cast members of WWVA Jamboree in Wheeling, West Virginia until 1957. Their band was called The Clinch Mountain Clan.  In 1948, Cooper signed a recording contract with Columbia with the help of Fred Rose that lasted to 1955. In 1954, Cooper joined the Grand Ole Opry.

He also recorded for Rich-R-Tone, Hickory Records and Decca.

Death
In 1973, Stoney's health began to fail; he suffered a series of heart attacks and spent long periods in the hospital. Finally, he suffered a heart attack on February 4, 1977, from which he died in the intensive care unit of a Nashville hospital on March 22, 1977.

Discography

Singles with Wilma Lee Cooper

References

Bibliography
 The Country Music Encyclopedia, Melvin Shestack. 1974, KBO Publishers, Inc., 
 Country Music, U.S.A., Bill C. Malone. 1985, University of Texas Press,

External links
[ Stony Cooper at allmusic.com]
 Biography

1918 births
1977 deaths
People from Randolph County, West Virginia
American country singer-songwriters
American country fiddlers
Grand Ole Opry members
20th-century American singers
Country musicians from West Virginia
Singer-songwriters from West Virginia